The  was a Japanese domain of the Edo period, located in Suo Province (modern-day Shūnan, Yamaguchi). It was a branch of the neighboring Chōshū Domain.

List of lords

Mōri clan (Tozama; 45,000->30,000->40,000 koku)

Naritaka
Motokata
Mototsugu
Mototaka
Hirotoyo
Hirotomo
Nariyoshi
Hiroshige
Motomitsu

References
 Tokuyama on "Edo 300 HTML" (in Japanese)

Domains of Japan
Shūnan, Yamaguchi